Krikor Alozian (born 24 April 1979) is a Lebanese former professional footballer who played as a midfielder. 

Alozian spent most of his career at Sagesse, having previously played for Homenetmen Beirut and Tripoli. He also represented the Lebanon national team from 1999 to 2004.

Notes

References

External links
 
 
 

1979 births
Living people
Lebanese footballers
Lebanese people of Armenian descent
Association football midfielders
Lebanese Premier League players
Homenetmen Beirut footballers
Olympic Beirut players
AC Tripoli players
Sagesse SC footballers
Lebanon international footballers
Armenian footballers